Ailello hui Daimine (died 749) was the 20th King of Uí Maine.

The Annals of Tigernach report of him "Bass Ailello h-ui Daimine, ríg h-Úa Maine", though it does not provide the details or context of his death.

He does not seem to appear in the genealogies and, besides an apparent relationship to king Dunchadh ua Daimhine (died 780), does not seem to have left any notable progeny.

Notes

References

 Annals of Ulster at CELT: Corpus of Electronic Texts at University College Cork
 Annals of Tigernach at CELT: Corpus of Electronic Texts at University College Cork
Revised edition of McCarthy's synchronisms at Trinity College Dublin.
 Byrne, Francis John (2001), Irish Kings and High-Kings, Dublin: Four Courts Press,

External links
 Commentary by Dan M. Wiley (The Cycles of the Kings Web Project)

People from County Galway
People from County Roscommon
745 deaths
8th-century Irish monarchs
Kings of Uí Maine
Year of birth unknown